Chengjiao line of the Zhengzhou Metro, planned to be part of Line 9 in the future, is a rapid transit line in Zhengzhou. It was opened on 12 January 2017. This line is 40.84 km long with 19 stations (16 stations in operation).

Through services are operated on Line 2 and Chengjiao line, although they are classified as separate lines.

Opening timeline

Stations

References

Chengjiao line, Zhengzhou Metro
Railway lines opened in 2017
2017 establishments in China
Airport rail links in China
Zhengzhou Metro lines